was a Japanese rower. He competed in the men's coxed four event at the 1932 Summer Olympics.

References

External links
 

1909 births
Year of death missing
Japanese male rowers
Olympic rowers of Japan
Rowers at the 1932 Summer Olympics
Place of birth missing